Edward Thomas Milburn (born 15 September 1967) is a former English cricketer. Milburn was a right-handed batsman who bowled right-arm medium pace. He was born in Nuneaton, Warwickshire.

Milburn made his first-class debut for Warwickshire against Hampshire in the 1987 County Championship. He made 2 further first-class appearances in 1987 for Warwickshire, against Somerset and Sussex. In his 3 first-class matches for the county, he scored 37 runs at an average of 18.50, with a highest score of 24. With the ball, he took 2 wickets at a bowling average of 64.00, with a best analysis of 1/26. He left Warwickshire at the end of the 1989 season.

He later joined Gloucestershire, making his first-class debut for against the touring Indians in 1990. He made 2 further first-class appearances for Gloucestershire, against Hampshire in the 1990 County Championship and Oxford University in 1991. In his 3 matches, Milburn scored 49 runs at an average of 24.50, with a highest score of 35. With the ball, he took 3 wickets at an average of 59.66, with best figures of 3/43. He made his List A debut for Gloucestershire in the 1990 Refuge Assurance League against Glamorgan. He made 9 further List A appearances, the last of which came against Lancashire in the 1991 Refuge Assurance League. In his 10 matches, he scored 43 runs at an average of 14.33, with a highest score of 21, while with the ball he took 4 wickets at an average of 46.50, with best figures of 2/34. Unable to perform consistently at the highest domestic level, Milburn was released by Gloucestershire at the end of the 1991 season.

References

External links
Edward Milburn at ESPNcricinfo
Edward Milburn at CricketArchive

1967 births
Living people
Sportspeople from Nuneaton
English cricketers
Warwickshire cricketers
Gloucestershire cricketers